Postern Mountain is a peak in the Canadian Rockies, in British Columbia that is a part of the Ramparts range. It is 2,944 m to the summit and is adjacent to Geikie Creek, a small stream connected to the Fraser River. It is notable for its steep cliff faces and abundance of quartzite, unusual for the majority-limestone mountains that surround it. These factors make it, along with the rest of the Ramparts, an attractive destination for mountain climbers.

References 

Mountains of British Columbia
Two-thousanders of British Columbia
Canadian Rockies